Kenya competed at the 2018 Commonwealth Games in the Gold Coast, Australia from April 4 to April 15, 2018.

Track and field athlete Elijah Manangoi was the country's flag bearer during the opening ceremony.

Medalists

Competitors
The following is the list of number of competitors participating at the Games per sport/discipline.

Athletics

Men
Track & road events

* Competed in the heats only.

Field events

Combined events – Decathlon

Women
Track & road events

Field events

Badminton

Kenya participated with two athletes (one man and one woman)

Boxing

Kenya participated with a team of 10 athletes (7 men and 3 women)

Men

Women

Cycling

Kenya participated with 4 athletes (4 men).

Road
Men

Lawn bowls

Kenya will compete in Lawn bowls.

Powerlifting

Kenya participated with 3 athletes (1 man and 2 women).

Rugby sevens

Men's tournament

Kenya qualified a men's team of 12 athletes by being among the top nine ranked nations from the Commonwealth in the 2016–17 World Rugby Sevens Series ranking.

Roster

Eden Agero
Willie Ambaka
Andrew Amonde
Collins Injera
Ian Minjire
Billy Odhiambo
Samuel Oliech
Jeffrey Oluoch
Oscar Ouma
Arthur Owira
Nelson Oyoo
Daniel Sikuta

Pool C

Classification semi-finals

Match for seventh place

Women's tournament

Roster

Linet Arasa
Cynthia Atieno
Sheilla Chajira
Celestine Masinde
Rachael Mbogo
Janet Okelo
Grace Okulu
Judith Okumu
Philadelphia Olando
Michelle Omondi
Stacey Otieno
Doreen Remour

Pool A

Classification semi-finals

Match for fifth place

Shooting

Kenya participated with 5 athletes (3 men and 2 women).

Men

Women

Open

Squash

Kenya participated with 2 athletes (1 man and 1 woman).

Individual

Doubles

Swimming

Kenya participated with 6 athletes (2 men and 4 women).

Men

Women

Table tennis

Kenya participated with 2 athletes (1 man and 1 woman).

Singles

Doubles

Triathlon

Kenya participated with 1 athlete (1 woman).

Individual

Weightlifting

Kenya participated with 5 athletes (3 men and 2 women).

Wrestling

Kenya participated with 2 athletes (1 man and 1 woman).

Men

Women

See also
Kenya at the 2018 Summer Youth Olympics

References

Nations at the 2018 Commonwealth Games
Kenya at the Commonwealth Games
2018 in Kenyan sport